Kaiser is a lunar impact crater. It lies in the crater-riddled terrain in the southern part of the Moon's near side. It was named after the Dutch astronomer Frederik Kaiser. The crater is nearly attached to the northeast rim the slightly larger crater Fernelius, and the two are separated by an irregular patch of ground only a few kilometers wide. To the northwest of Kaiser lies Nonius, a crater remnant.

The rim of this crater is heavily worn from impact erosion, and the features have been generally softened and rounded. Parts of the southern inner wall has become incised, and the elongated satellite crater Kaiser A lies across the eastern rim. The interior floor of Kaiser is relatively featureless, being marked only by a few tiny craterlets.

Satellite craters

By convention these features are identified on lunar maps by placing the letter on the side of the crater midpoint that is closest to Kaiser.

References

 
 
 
 
 
 
 
 
 
 
 

Impact craters on the Moon